Italferr is a consulting and project company belonging to FS (Ferrovie dello Stato), the Italian railway state company.

Italferr, the Italian State Railways Group engineering firm, operates on the Italian and international markets in the field of railway transport engineering.

In 2014 the company celebrated its first thirty years.

History 
The company was founded in 1984, with the aim of promoting the Italian engineering excellence in the railway sector, on the national and international market.

In 1999, 15 years after his foundation, the company was the first market player in the sector, in Italy. Today, it is in charge of the construction of all the High-speed rail in Italy.

In the international market, the company prepared the General Plan for Transport for Iraq, gives technical assistance to Czech, Slovak, Slovenian Ministry of Transport and Bosnia and Herzegovina, for the development of the Macedonian and Serbian railways.

In 2004–2009, Italferr develops the methodology for measuring Climate Footprint, already in the design phase, for the  emissions in the construction of a railway infrastructure. The company wins two Merit Award, one for the integrated management system "Quality Environment, Health and Safety" (ISO 9001, ISO 14001, OHSAS 18001) and the other one for the new method of climate footprint calculation (ISO 14064-1).

The foreign portfolio is strengthened with some operations in Algeria, Romania, Croatia, Serbia, and the beginning of the project for the modernization of the Balkan rail corridor.

The company strengthens its international commitment by consolidating trade relations with the Balkans, through the revision of the Strategic Plan for the modernization of the railway network of the country. To maintain the market position in this area, it constitutes the Infrastructure Engineering Services, a company owned 100% by Italferr. It also take in charge the feasibility study of the Tirana multimodal station, and the design of a railway line in Croatia. He won the competition for the design of the first African High-speed line in Casablanca. It also designed in Egypt the new signaling system for the line the Cairo-Port Said. It provides technical assistance to ANESRIF, the Algerian Government Agency for the implementation of program of rail investment, and with the '' Arab railway network Study "defines all actions aimed at creating a railway network that can facilitate the integration for the Arab world.

Main activities 
 Master plan and transport surveys
 Feasibility studies
 Environmental impact studies and monitoring
 Cost estimate, planning and control
 Integrated Management Systems (IMS)
 Value Engineering 
 BIM (Building Information Modeling) Management 
 System Engineering 
 System Assurance 
 Safety Management 
 Preliminary, detailed and execution design
 Safety Management
 Project Validation
 Project Management 
 Work management/Supervision
 Safety
 Testing, start-up and operation assistance
 Activation and commissioning
 Tendering documents and procedures
 Design & Build 
 Innovation, research and development
 Innovation Solutions 
 HR training and organizational consulting
 Human Resources Training (HRT)

References

Ferrovie dello Stato Italiane
Railway companies of Italy
Consulting firms of Italy